SC 42 may refer to:

Convoy SC 42, a World War II transatlantic convoy of merchant ships
, a United States Navy submarine chaser commissioned in 1918 and sold in 1921
 Scandium-42 (Sc-42 or 42Sc), an isotope of scandium